Paul Campion is an English/New Zealand film director, and screenwriter.

Life and career
Born in England, Campion studied technical illustration at Bournemouth and Poole College of Art and Design. He began his career as a freelance illustrator and was represented by Folio Artists Agents in London. He created book cover illustrations for authors such as Wilbur Smith and Ben Elton.

In 1999 he completed a Master's degree in Computer Animation at Bournemouth University, and then moved to New Zealand where he worked on Peter Jackson's The Lord of the Rings film trilogy, as a texture painter, creating digital textures for the Balrog, Mûmakil, Fellbeast and Shelob.

He then worked as a matte painter on Sin City, "Constantine", as a texture painter on The Waterhorse and the remake of The Dambusters and as a concept artist on X-Men: The Last Stand, Dorian Gray, Clash of the Titans and The Chronicles of Narnia: The Voyage of the Dawn Treader.

Short films
In 2006 Campion directed his first short film, the black comedy horror Night of the Hell Hamsters. In 2008 he followed this up with the short science fiction horror film Eel Girl, featuring special makeup effects by Weta Workshop.  In 2016 Campion directed his third short film The Naughty List, based on a short story by author Brian Keene.

Feature films
In 2010 he wrote and directed his first feature film The Devil's Rock, co-written with Paul Finch and Brett Ihaka. Set in the Channel Islands during WW2, it tells the story of two New Zealand commandos who uncover a Nazi plot to summon up a demon, using a book of black magic.

Planned feature films
Dark Hollow is a planned feature film based on the novel "Dark Hollow" by US author Brian Keene.
Kill Whitey is a planned feature film based on the novel "Kill Whitey" by US author Brian Keene.
Scorpion Raiders is a planned World War 2 feature film based on the true story of the Long Range Desert Group's Barce raid (Operation Caravan).
Voodoo Dawn is a zombie feature film previously called "Lore of the Jungle", set in London, written by Paul Finch.  Campion described the film as "set in London and involves black magic and re-animated corpses and it's designed to be a very fun entertaining Evil Dead 2/Dusk Till Dawn style film."

Filmography

Awards and nominations

Night of the Hell Hamsters (2007)
A Night of Horror International Film Festival – Best Director
Vine Short Film Festival – Best Horror Film 
Zompire: The Undead Film Festival — Audience Favourite
Big Mountain Short Film Festival – Audience Favourite 
Tabloid Witch Awards – Honorable Mention
Terror Film Festival – Best Horror Short Film (nominated)
Eel Girl (2008)
Brest European Short Film Festival – Canal+ Cocotte Minute
Court Metrange Film Festival – Grand Prix
H.P. Lovecraft Film Festival – Best Short Film and Best Comedy
Tabloid Witch Awards – Honorable Mention
Rushes Soho Shorts Film Festival – Best Short Film (nominated)
Dark Carnival Film Festival – Best Short Film (nominated)
The Naughty List (2016)
One-Reeler Short Film Competition – Award of Excellence
Best Comedy Short Film – The Austin Comedy Short Film Festival, 2017 (nominated)
Best Screenplay – Short Film – GenreBlast Film Festival, 2017 (nominated)
Funniest Short Film – GenreBlast Film Festival, 2017 (nominated)
Best Overall Short Film – GenreBlast Film Festival, 2017 (nominated)

References

External links
 Paul Campion's Official website
 
 The Gnomon Workshop

Alumni of Arts University Bournemouth
Alumni of Bournemouth University
English film directors
English illustrators
English screenwriters
English male screenwriters
Horror film directors
Living people
Matte painters
People educated at Dulwich College
Visual effects artists
Year of birth missing (living people)